Schistura rikiki is a species of ray-finned fish, a stone loach, in the genus Schistura. It occurs in the Se Kong basin in southern Laos where it can be found in riffles over substrates of gravel and stones. The specific name rikiki is French slang for small or pint-sized, a reference to its small size.

References

R
Fish described in 2000